The Prix Daru was a Group 2 flat horse race in France open to three-year-old thoroughbreds. It was run at Longchamp over a distance of 2,100 metres (about 1 mile and 2½ furlongs), and it was scheduled to take place each year in mid-April.

History
The event was established in 1841, and it was originally called the Poule des Produits. It was initially staged at the Champ de Mars, and was later transferred to Longchamp. For a period it was held in May.

The race continued as the Poule des Produits until 1876. It was renamed in memory of Viscount Paul Daru, who served as president of the Société d'Encouragement, in 1877.

The Prix Daru was one of several trials for the Prix du Jockey Club collectively known as the Poules des Produits. The others (listed by their modern titles) were the Prix Lupin, the Prix Hocquart, the Prix Noailles and the Prix Greffulhe. From 1885, the Prix Daru was restricted to horses whose dams were born outside France. The event was funded by entries submitted before a horse's birth, in the year of its conception.

The race merged with the Prix Noailles during the 1940s. The combined event, the Prix Daru-Noailles, was contested over 2,150 metres at Le Tremblay in 1943. It took place at Maisons-Laffitte in 1944 and 1945, and Longchamp in 1946.

The present system of race grading was introduced in 1971, and the Prix Daru was classed at Group 2 level. It was discontinued after 1977. Its last winner was Carwhite, ridden by Freddy Head, trained by Alec Head and owned by Jacques Wertheimer.

Winners
 1841: Cauchemar
 1842: Angora
 1843: Governor
 1844: Commodor Napier
 1846: Fleet
 1847: Glands
 1848: Lioubliou
 1850: Babiega
 1851: Illustration
 1852: Aguila
 1853: Fontaine
 1854: Lysisca
 1855: Monarque
 1856: Nat
 1857: Florin
 1858: Gouvieux
 1859: Geologie
 1860: Violette
 1862: Benjamin
 1863: Pergola
 1864: Bois Roussel
 1865: Tourmalet
 1866: Marengo
 1867: Cerf Volant
 1868: Ouragan
 1869: Peripetie
 1871: no race
 1872: Nethon
 1873: Boiard
 1874: Destinee
 1875: Almanza
 1876: Braconnier
 1877: La Jonchere
 1878: Stathouder
 1879: Salteador
 1880: Voilette
 1881: Albion IV
 1882: Mademoiselle de Senlis
 1883: Rubens
 1884: Archiduc

 1885: Extra
 1886: Jupin
 1887: Le Sancy
 1888: Stuart
 1889: Thomery
 1890: Flibustier
 1891: Ermak
 1892: Diarbek
 1893: Fousi Yama
 1894: Idle Boy
 1895: Arioviste
 1896: Champaubert
 1897: Quilda
 1898: Le Samaritain
 1899: Perth
 1900: Solon
 1901: Saxon
 1902: Arizona
 1903: Caius
 1904: Sam Sam
 1905: Jardy
 1906: Crillon
 1907: Sans Souci
 1908: Gigolo
 1909: Oversight
 1910: Or du Rhin
 1911: Shetland
 1912: Floraison
 1913: Ecouen
 1914: La Farina
 1920: Boscobel
 1921: Le Majordome
 1922: Zariba
 1923: Le Capucin
 1924: Pot au Feu
 1925: Lucide
 1926: Soubadar
 1927: Mon Talisman
 1928: Mondovi
 1929: Donatello

 1930: Potiphar
 1931: Barneveldt
 1932: Shred
 1933: Vareuse
 1934: Le Gosse
 1935: Ipe
 1936: Bel Aethel
 1937: Victrix
 1938: Astrologer
 1939: Mon Tresor
 1940: Loliondo
 1941: Le Corail
 1942: Tornado
 1943–46: see Prix Noailles
 1947: Tharsis
 1948: Boby
 1949: Norval
 1950: Damasco
 1951: Aquino
 1952: Luzon
 1953: Buisson d'Or
 1954: Popof
 1955: Kurun
 1956: Ambiax
 1957: Amber
 1958: Yoggi
 1959: Gric
 1960: Pharamond
 1961: Moutiers
 1962: Exbury
 1963: Beau Persan
 1964: Papaya
 1965: Jacambre
 1966: Pasha
 1967: Carmarthen
 1968: Scherzo
 1969: Budapest
 1970: Gyr
 1971: Irish Ball
 1972: Lyphard
 1973: Rose Laurel
 1974: Dankaro
 1975: Easy Regent
 1976: Youth
 1977: Carwhite

See also
 List of French flat horse races
 Recurring sporting events established in 1841 – this race is included under its original title, Poule des Produits.

References

 france-galop.com – A Brief History: Prix Noailles.
 galopp-sieger.de – Prix Daru (ex Poule des Produits).
 pedigreequery.com – Prix Daru – Longchamp.

Horse races in France
Longchamp Racecourse
Flat horse races for three-year-olds
Discontinued horse races